Gyger is a surname. Notable people with the surname include:

Patrick Gyger (born 1971), Swiss historian and writer
Pia Gyger (1940–2014), Swiss Zen master 
Rudolf Gyger (1920–1996), Swiss footballer
Walter Gyger, Swiss diplomat